Nanyun  (also spelt Namyun) is a town in the Sagaing Division in Myanmar.

External links
[ Satellite map at Maplandia.com]

 
Populated places in Sagaing Region
Township capitals of Myanmar